Simon Carless is a video game industry businessperson and former game designer and editor. Simon is the founder of GameDiscoverCo, a video game discoverability consultancy firm, and previously worked overseeing the worldwide Game Developers Conference event and Black Hat information security events.

Carless is Chairman Emeritus of the Independent Games Festival, and he co-founded the Independent Games Summit as part of Game Developers Conference in 2007.

Carless formerly edited the games section on Slashdot, and he worked as a lead game designer at Kuju Entertainment, Eidos Interactive and Atari. He wrote Gaming Hacks, a book published by O'Reilly Media.

Carless was also active in the demoscene of the early 1990s, releasing modules under the moniker Hollywood. He operated the netlabel Monotonik from 1996 to 2009.

References

External links 

Simon Carless's blog

Living people
British video game designers
English magazine editors
Year of birth missing (living people)
Tracker musicians
O'Reilly writers